The San Pedro River Preserve is a Nature Conservancy preserve in Dudleyville, Arizona.

The Preserve comprises  of deeded land along the San Pedro River acquired for the protection of southwestern willow flycatcher (Empidonax traillii extimus) habitat. There are two miles of cottonwood/willow riparian. It is one of several properties along the Lower San Pedro River owned and managed by The Nature Conservancy (TNC). This property isn't open to the general public, but permission to enter may be granted for research projects and groups—contact the preserve manager. Birds here are typical of this stretch of the river—many of the birds can be found at the public access crossings along the river both north and south of the property.

The money for the project was acquired through the Roosevelt Lake Mitigation project from the Salt River Project.

In the summer of 2005, it was nearly burnt to the ground as part of the Great Dudleyville Fire of that year.

References

External links
 Nature Conservancy sites along the San Pedro River

Protected areas of Pinal County, Arizona
Nature reserves in Arizona
Nature Conservancy preserves
San Pedro Valley (Arizona)